These are the straits of the United States.
 Agate Pass in Puget Sound 
 Arthur Kill separates Staten Island and New Jersey 
 Carquinez Strait connects San Pablo Bay and Suisun Bay in California
 Chatham Strait  between Chichagof Island and Admiralty Island, Alaska
 Clarence Strait between Prince of Wales Island (Alaska) and mainland Alaska
 Colvos Passage in Puget Sound
 Dalco Passage in Puget Sound
 Deception Pass in Puget Sound
 Detroit River connects Lakes Erie and St Clair
 East River  between Manhattan, the Bronx and Long Island
 Erie Canal between Lake Erie and Hudson River
 Harlem River between Manhattan and The Bronx
 Kill Van Kull between Staten Island and Bayonne, New Jersey
 The Narrows between Staten Island and Brooklyn, New York
 Niagara River between Lakes Erie and Ontario
 Pickering Passage in Puget Sound
 Port Washington Narrows in Puget Sound
 Porte des Morts between Green Bay (Lake Michigan) and Lake Michigan
 Rich Passage in Puget Sound
 Sakonnet River between Aquidneck Island and Tiverton and Little Compton, Rhode Island
 San Luis Pass between Galveston Island and Texas mainland
 St. Clair River separates Lakes Huron and St Clair 
 St. Mary's River separates Lakes Superior and Huron
 Straits of Florida separates the Florida peninsula from Cuba
 Strait of Juan de Fuca borders Canada
 Straits of Mackinac between Lakes Huron and Michigan

See also 
 List of canals in the United States
 List of rivers in the United States
 List of waterways (in the world)

 
Lists of landforms of the United States